Lilium lancifolium (syn. L. tigrinum) is an Asian species of lily, native to China, Japan, Korea, and the Russian Far East. It is widely planted as an ornamental because of its showy orange-and-black flowers, and sporadically occurs as a garden escapee in North America, particularly the eastern United States including New England, and has made incursions into some southern states such as Georgia.

It has the English name tiger lily, but that name has been applied to other species as well.

Description 

L. lancifolium produces aerial bulblets, known as bulbils, in the leaf axils. These bulbils are uncommon in Lilium species and they produce new plants that are clones of the original plant.

The flowers are odorless. Each lasts a few days and if pollinated produce capsules with many thin seeds.

Taxonomy

Varieties 

The names of names considered as varieties at some time are:

The Lilium tigrinum flore pleno, the double-flowered variety, had been exported out of Japan by William Bull since 1869.

Names

Scientific names 
Botanists for many years considered L. tigrinum (after Ker Gawler) the correct scientific name until it was determined that older name L. lancifolium (after Thunberg) refers to the same species, and the latter became the accepted name.

Vernacular names 
Its common name is tiger lily. Although this name is ambiguous across several species, it is correctly applied to this species alone.

Cat toxicity 
A case study of the successful treatment of a cat that ingested this particular species was published 2007.

Uses 

It is cultivated and wild foraged in Asia for its edible bulbs. The cultivar 'Splendens' has gained the Royal Horticultural Society's Award of Garden Merit. In Taiwan, both the flower and bulbs are used as food, as are the other related species: L. brownii var. viridulum, L. pumilum and L. candidum.

Notes

References

Bibliography

External links

lancifolium
Flora of China
Flora of Eastern Asia
Flora of the Russian Far East
Medicinal plants
Root vegetables
Plants described in 1794